Luitpold of Znojmo (died 15 March 1112), a member of the Přemyslid dynasty, ruled as Moravian duke of Znojmo for twenty years – from 1092 until his death.

Family

He was the second son of Duke Conrad I of Bohemia (died 1092) and his consort, the Bavarian countess Wirpirk of Tengling. Luitpold's father ruled the Duchy of Bohemia only for a few months before his death, having succeeded his elder brother Vratislaus II. Both had wrangled over the newly implemented seniority principle with their eldest brother Duke Spytihněv II: not until Spytihněv's death in 1061 and the accession of Vratislaus II to the Bohemian throne, Conrad received his share, ruling over the Moravian lands of Znojmo and Brno for more than 30 years.

Luitpold did not succeed his father as Duke of Bohemia; according to the principle of agnatic seniority, the ducal title passed to his eldest cousin Bretislav II, son of the late Vratislaus II. Instead, Luitpold ruled in half of Moravia (the western part) as his father Conrad I, though again divided into two principalities: Brno and Znojmo, and Luitpold was co-ruler (diarch) for all in this part with his elder brother Ulrich I.

All Moravian lines of the Přemyslid dynasty as a whole were systematically associated by dynastic marriages with princesses of major royal and ducal dynasties, especially Árpád dynasty, Rurik dynasty, Piast dynasty, Nemanjić dynasty-senior line, Vukanović, the House of Babenberg and other dynasties of Bavarian dukes; as it was the other way around (vice versa). Members of the Moravian dynasty were fully predisposed to take over the central throne (for both countries – Bohemia and Moravia) in Prague, under the principles of agnatic seniority.

Domestic policy 

Luitpold ruled over southern Moravia as diarch in Znojmo for 20 years, once interrupted by the illegitimate regency of Duke Bretislav II in 1099–1100, when he and Ulrich were evicted. Both fell out with Bretislav when the duke tried to enforce the succession of his younger brother Bořivoj. He had Ulrich captured and arrested in Kladsko, while Luitpold fought against the forces of Bořivoj's father-in-law, the Babenberg margrave Leopold II of Austria.

Upon Duke Bretislav's assassination in 1100, Emperor Henry IV confirmed the accession of Bořivoj to the Prague throne; nevertheless Luitpold and Ulrich enforced their return to Moravia and the restoration of the Brno duchy – with the help of Austrian and Bavarian armed forces as well as with indirect support by the emperor, whom the brothers visited in early February 1101 in Frankfurt. After they returned, they continued to reign in the two principalities of Brno and Znojmo in certain territorial union. Emperor Henry IV gave Ulrich insignia of rank and banner (vexillum) for their reign as Moravian dukes, while Luitpold's brother officially renounced all claims to the Prague throne. Luitpold himself, however, once again participated in the successful rebellion led by his Moravian cousin Svatopluk of Olomouc against Duke Bořivoj in 1107.

About 1101, Luitpold and Ulrich together established the Benedictine abbey of Třebíč and prepared its St. Procopius Church as mausoleum for the Brno-Znojmo branch of the Přemyslid dynasty, where they were both were buried. Luitpold died in 1112, whereafter his Znojmo principality passed to Ulrich.

Marriage and issue 

By his marriage to Princess Ida of Babenberg, daughter of Margrave Leopold II of Austria and his consort Ida of Formbach, he had one son, the other children (if any) are unknown;

Conrad II, who legitimately succeeded his father as Duke of Moravia, Prince of Znojmo from 1123 to 1128 and again from 1134 until his death about 1161.

Ancestry

Ancestry

See also
 History of Moravia
 Ducal Rotunda of the Virgin Mary and St Catherine
 Conrad II, Duke of Bohemia
 Helena of Znojmo

Citations and notes

References

Bibliography

Primary sources 
 COSMAS, (Canonicus Pragensis); Chronica Boëmorum. (Latin)
 COSMAS of Prague, (Canon of Prague),Translated by Lisa Wolverton (2009); Chronicle of the Czechs (Chronicle of Bohemias).  The Catholic university of America Press. (English)
 Constinuatio Claustroneoburgensis prima. MHG SS IX, p. 612 (Latin)

Secondary sources 
 KRZEMIEŃSKA, Barbara; MERAHAUTOVÁ, Anežka; TŘEŠTÍK, Dušan (2000). Moravští Přemyslovci ve Znojemské rotundě. Praha: SetOut. 135 p.. . (in Czech)
 WOLVERTON, Lisa (2001). Hastening toward Prague. Philadelphia, University of Pennsylvania Press.   (English)
 REITINGER, Lukáš. Nekrologia kláštera Pegau. Pozapomenuté svědectví o Přemyslovcích (nejen) Kosmova věku. In: WIHODA, Martin; REITINGER, Lukáš (2010). Proměna středovýchodní Evropy raného a vrcholného středověku. Brno : Matice moravská, . . pp. 373–374 (in Czech)
 GROSMANNOVÁ, Dagmar (2010). Medieval Coinage in Moravia.In: GALUŠKA, Luděk; MITÁČEK, Jiří; NOVOTNÁ Lea. Treasures of Moravia. Brno:Moravian Museum Press. . pp. 371–374 (English)
 BRETHOLZ, Berthold (1910).Studien zu Cosmas von Prag V. Die Brunner Cosmas Handschrift, NA 35, 1910 pp. 692–702 (German)
 MOLECZ, P. (2003):Die Hanthaler-Fälschungen im Lilielnfelder Nekrolog am Beispiel der Schwestern des Heiligen Leopold. Eine Beitrag zur Barocken Wischenschaftsgeschichte und Babenbergergenealogie. MIÖG 111, pp. 241–284, exact 360–365. (in German)
 SOMMER, Petr; TŘEŠTÍK, Dušan; ŽEMLIČKA, Josef, a kol. Přemyslovci. Budování českého státu. Praha : Nakladatelství Lidové noviny, 2009. 779 s. .  
 WIHODA, Martin. Morava v době knížecí 906–1197. Praha : Nakladatelství Lidové noviny, 2010. 464 s. .
 ČERNÝ, Pavel. Zobrazení přemyslovské genealogie v rotundě sv. Kateřiny ve Znojmě a některé aspekty její interpretace, in: Znojemská rotunda ve světle vědeckého zkoumání.  pp. 78–92 (in Czech)
 MĚCHUROVÁ, Zdeňka (2010). From the medieval history of Moravia. In: GALUŠKA, Luděk; MITÁČEK, Jiří; NOVOTNÁ Lea. Treasures of Moravia.Brno:Moravian Museum Press. . pp. 107–115 (English)  
 ŽEMLIČKA, Josef (2005). Přemyslovci. Jak žili, vládli, umírali. Praha: Nakladatelství Lidové noviny, . 497 s. . (in Czech)

External links 
MORAVIA, dukes and margraves genealogy tables  
The Ducal Rotunda of the Virgin Mary and St Catherine web page  
The Ducal Rotunda in Znojmo – A virtual tour  
Moravia dukes – Ulrich of Brno part  
 

Roman Catholic monarchs
People from Moravia
Přemyslid dynasty
Younger sons of dukes
1112 deaths
Year of birth unknown
Znojmo